Marcus Campbell (born 22 September 1972) is a Scottish former professional snooker player. He was ranked within the world's top 64 for 15 consecutive seasons.

Career 
Campbell is most famous for whitewashing Stephen Hendry 9–0 in the 1998 Liverpool Victoria UK Championship, one of the most surprising results in snooker's history. He followed this win with a 9–6 win over Quinten Hann in the last 32.

He started the 2007/2008 season strongly by reaching the last 16 of the Grand Prix, coming through the qualifiers and beating players like Graeme Dott and Anthony Hamilton before his run ended in a 5–2 defeat to Joe Swail. He also reached the last 32 of the Welsh Open where he beat Lee Spick, Ricky Walden and Gerard Greene and gave Ding Junhui a run for his money before Ding eventually won 5–4. He qualified for the 2008 Bahrain Championship before scoring a 147 in his wildcard match against Ahmed Basheer Al-Khusaibi. He lost to eventual champion Neil Robertson in the last 32. He then qualified for the 2010 World Championship, where he lost 10–5 to Mark Williams.

Campbell won the first professional tournament of his career in Germany when he won Event 3 of the Euro Players Tour Championship beating Liang Wenbo 4–0 in the final. This result along with other consistent performances were enough to see him enter the top 32 in the rankings. He also qualified for the world championship for the second successive year, where he played Shaun Murphy. He subsequently lost 10–1 to Murphy.

In the 2011–12 season Campbell qualified for six of the eight ranking events. His best results of the season were last 16 exits at the Australian Goldfields Open, where he lost 1–5 to Mark Allen, and at the World Open, thanks to Ali Carter withdrawing from the event, before being defeated by Graeme Dott 3–5. 
He played former champion Matthew Stevens in the first round of the UK Championship, despite the death of a close friend just a few hours before. Stevens won the match 6–2. Campbell played in all 12 of the PTC events, making two quarter-finals in Event 1 and Event 3, to finish 30th in the Order of Merit, just out of the top 24 who made the Finals. Campbell played Liang Wenbo in the final qualifying round for the World Championship and produced two comebacks in the match having trailed 2–8 and 5–9 to level at 9–9, before the match was delayed to let the evening session's order of play begin. Liang had time to compose himself and won the decider to end Campbell's season, which he finished ranked world number 25.

The 2012–13 season began very well for Campbell as he qualified for the Wuxi Classic, where he reached the first ranking event semi-final of his 21-year professional career. He dispatched Stephen Lee, Fergal O'Brien and Mark Williams to play Ricky Walden in the semis. He lost the match 1–6 and stated afterwards that he "didn't feel comfortable at all" and put it down to nerves. However, he also felt that winning a ranking tournament was now within his reach. He qualified for four of the next seven ranking events, but lost in the first round on each occasion. He had his best run of the season since Wuxi at the China Open where he overcame Peter Ebdon 5–3 and Graeme Dott 5–4 to make the quarter-finals. There, Campbell lost 2–5 to Neil Robertson. Campbell qualified for the World Championship with a 10–4 victory against Liam Highfield and played defending champion Ronnie O'Sullivan in the first round, who had taken a year away from snooker since lifting the title 12 months previously. Campbell missed opportunities in the first session to finish it 2–7 behind and went on to lose 4–10. Campbell was ranked world number 28 at the end of the season.

Campbell lost in the first round to local favourites in the first two ranking events he qualified for in the 2013–14 season. In the Australian Goldfields Open it was Neil Robertson who eliminated him 5–1 and at the Indian Open he lost 4–1 to Pankaj Advani. At the UK Championship Campbell saw off Lü Haotian and Michael White, but was then beaten 6–2 by Ronnie O'Sullivan. Campbell could not advance beyond the first round in any of the remaining ranking events and suffered a surprise 10–4 defeat to Alex Borg in World Championship qualifying, a player who had until then only won three matches all season.

Campbell was thrashed 5–0 by Ricky Walden in the first round of the Australian Goldfields Open. This proved to be his only last 32 showing in any event this season and, after he failed to progress past the last 32 of either of the two Q School events, he dropped off the tour as he was the world number 68, just outside the top 64 who remain. He has not played in an event since.

Performance and rankings timeline

Career finals

Minor-ranking finals: 1 (1 title)

Non-ranking finals: 2 (1 title)

Pro-am finals: 1

Amateur finals: 1 (1 title)

References

External links 

 
 
 Profile on Global Snooker
 Profile on Yahoo! Sport
 Video of 147 break from 2008

Scottish snooker players
1972 births
Living people
Sportspeople from Dumbarton